Stony Lake (also called Stoney Lake) is a lake in Peterborough County in central Ontario, Canada. There are three interconnected lakes (Upper Stony Lake to the northeast, Stony Lake in the centre, and Clear Lake to the southwest) which together are known as Stony or Stoney Lake.  Stoney Lake forms the eastern end of the Kawartha Lakes region. It is primarily a summer cottage area but there are many permanent residences on the lakes.

Name
Stoney Lake was known to early European settlers as Salmon Trout Lake, but the modern name is fully appropriate. The lake actually consists of Stony Lake for the western and southern arms, the east arm is Stoney Lake. Salmon trout are no longer evident, but islands and shoals are everywhere. Today, Stoney Lake represents the classic Ontario ‘cottage country’, enjoyed by its many seasonal residents, by an increasing number of year-round residents, by boaters using the Trent–Severn Waterway, sport fishermen and many others.

Geography
Stoney Lake is located in Peterborough County nearly two hours northeast of Toronto. Sportfish caught in the lake include smallmouth and largemouth bass, walleye (Pickerel) and muskellunge (Musky). Geologically, the Kawartha lakes are on the boundary between two important land forms.

One of its islands, Fairy Lake Island, encloses another small body of water: Fairy Lake. Fairy Lake is surrounded by private property.

Geology

Like most lakes in Ontario, Stony Lake was created during and after the last ice age. The lake straddles the border between the Canadian Shield and the Great Lakes–St. Lawrence Lowlands land forms. The lake is influenced both by the rugged granite of the Canadian Shield to the north, and by the more gentle, heavily forested Great Lakes–St. Lawrence Lowlands to the south.

History
The region has been inhabited for thousands of years. Early First Nations settlement is evidenced by a remarkable collection of prehistoric rock carvings to be seen at the east end of Stony Lake in Petroglyphs Provincial Park. On-going historic research argues that Samuel de Champlain traveled through the area's lakes, rivers and overland portages in the 17th century.  The First Nations were joined in the 19th century by European settlers intent on logging and farming. In the mid-19th century logging became a large industry in the Kawarthas and Stoney Lake was used as part of the highway for moving logs to the sawmills downriver. The Trent-Severn Canal system was built early in the 20th century, and became the dominant commercial waterway in the region.

The American Canoe Association met on Juniper Island in 1883, and development evolved naturally from travellers fishing or hunting from simple lodges. Lengthier camping expeditions on the many islands became common. In the late 19th century and early 20th century many people from Ontario and the bordering U.S. states bought Crown land and built cottages. These were generally simple, one-story frame structures with few amenities. As well, those early settlers, at Young's Point, Kawartha Park, McCracken's Landing, Mount Julian and others around the lake, found new sources of income by helping cottagers in many ways: ice cutting, building, guiding, boat repairs and domestic chores. Stoney Lake today is principally used for recreational purposes. Some of the large islands include Juniper and Horseshoe island.

In pop culture
The film Cheaper by the Dozen 2 was shot at Mark Kennedy's property on the lake at Burleigh Falls. A water skiing scene in the movie contains several scenes of the Lake. The 2003 remake of the film The In-laws was shot on Stony Lake. The water ski team from Cypress Gardens, Florida has stayed at the Irwin Inn and practiced on the lake in front of the inn. Canadian rock band Rush, started work on the album Moving Pictures in August,1980 at Stony Lake, Ontario. Country singer Ronnie Hawkins also owned an estate on the lake until he sold it in late 2017 for $3.98 million.

See also

American Canoe Association

References

External links

 Association of Stoney Lake Cottagers

Lakes of Peterborough County